is a marble shooting toy franchise produced in Japan by Takara. It was originally based on the Bomberman series, but later expanded into other franchises and its own original designs.

The toy's design is a humanoid figure, with a round cavity in its abdomen that houses a specially made marble (though other marbles of the same size may be used). The marble is launched by pressing a spring-loaded trigger on the back of the figure. Different attachments and accessories can be used to change various traits of the B-Daman, such as its accuracy, power, balance, control, and firing rate. They are customizable, and each have their own special gimmick.

In the Japanese language Battle B-Daman toys, the marbles are referred to as "B-Dama". In all cases they are simply called "marbles" (bīdama, hence the name "B-Daman") in Japan. In the English language B-Daman toylines and media, the marbles were originally called 'B-DaBalls", but was later changed to "B-DaMarbles" for safety reasons.

Timeline
In 2004, Hasbro collaborated with Takara and Fox Entertainment Group to bring the franchise to the USA.
In 2005, Hasbro licensed the "Battle B-Daman" configuration of the toy.
In 2005, Takara licensed the show to Fox Entertainment Group.

Game rules
Depending on how it is played, there are different sets of game rules. In Hasbro's "Battle B-Daman" tournament set, it has the following 10 games:

Direct hit battle (DHB): Shoot at each other's B-Daman until the opponent's B-Daman's switch is hit. In the "Zero" system, this causes a cap to block the barrel and prevent any more B-Dama from being fired (originally a specially made game piece would pop out). Direct Hit Battle armor is required. (Note: Hasbro only sells the Zero, and blastercore versions)
Tag Team DHB: Similar to DHB, only you have teammates who you can tag in when you are not being fired at. You cannot tag in your tag team partner if their armor has been disabled.
DHB havoc: Similar to DHB, but the opposing B-Daman is behind target barricades placed in the battlefield.
B-Daman Invasion: Shoot at the battle puck in the arena until it reaches opponent's baseline. This is known as "Battle Hockey" in Japan.
Battle Hammer: Try to shoot the puck as far as you can using 5 shots.
Ultimate Strike: A classic bowling-esque game of shooting down as many target pins as possible in one shot.
Shoot the Gap: Shoot between standing target pins while avoiding hitting them.
B-Daman Assault: Flip your opponent's gates in 30 seconds.
B-Daman Blast: Flip 4 gates with 6 marbles.
Hard Target: Shooting a battle pin hidden behind target barricades.
B-DaChallenge: Each player sets up a shot and tries to complete it. If they are successful, their opponent must replicate it. The player that fails to replicate the opponent's shot is the loser.
B-Dama from 50 cm away. Score is determined by number of B-Dama that are shot out of the circle.
EZ battle getter: Place a pencil between opposing B-DaPlayers, then try to push the pencil to opponent by firing for 30 seconds. A match is won by pushing the pencil to the opponent's side.
EZ through the gate: Place 5 pins in a row, with each pin 5 cm away from the next closest pin. Fire from 60 cm away for 10 rounds. Each B-Dama that passes between the gap scores 10 points, while each pin knocked down is a 10-point penalty.
EZ broken three: Make a row of 3 targets with rubber(gomu) erasers, then fire at target from 50 cm away. Winner is determined by how long it takes to break the targets.
EZ sky jump: Place a paper cup with opening on top, then fire at the cup from 50 cm away for 3 shots. Winner is determined by how many B-DaBalls are shot into the cup.
Unless otherwise stated, the following rules use limited model B-Daman as targets:
EZ battle hockey: Same as EZ battle getter, but can use PET bottle (clear plastic beverage bottle) instead of pencil.
EZ time attack: Fire at a row of targets from 50 cm away. Adjust number of targets and firing distance as necessary. Winner is determined by the amount of firing time.
EZ battle bowling: Same as the regular EZ battle bowling.

Tournaments
Game tournaments are by Hasbro in Canada every summer. Takara hosts many tournaments year round in Japan, much like Beyblade.

B-Daman series
B-Daman was first produced in 1993, modeled after Bomberman, and hence was called "Bomberman B-Daman".

Bomberman B-Daman Bakugaiden series
Bakugaiden (1995): Assembled from western armour-themes parts, which was the basis for Battle B-Daman.
Bakugaiden II (1996): Was sold with Super Bomberman 4.
Bakugaiden III (1997): B-Daman can be turned into vehicles.
Bomberman B-Daman Bakugaiden IV (1998): Unlike previous series, it is only sold in unassembled form, with interchangeable parts. Starting from the premier of the TV series, kits are no longer numbered.
Bomberman B-Daman Bakugaiden V (1999):

Battle B-Daman series
Battle B-Daman is a manga series that debuted in 2003, accompanied by a toyline. This series also featured an anime television series in 2004. Battle B-Daman features the Zero System, which allows for interchangeable parts and customization.

Crash B-Daman series
Crash B-Daman was first launched at the end of 2005. This series specialized on shooting. It uses a pistol type grip and trigger, making it look vaguely like a pistol laid on its side. It is also compatible with some Battle B-Daman parts. The pistol grips and triggers vary in both size, color, and functionality. Crash only produced 40 models before being canceled. Many foreign players liked the design, but Japanese parents believed that the gun-like models were too violent for their kids just as their kids can enjoy, handle and be allowed to see guns on TV.

 Crash Series
Used simple gimmicks such as delta core, roller core, etc. Only barrels and magazines from Cartridge B-Daman were backwards compatible.

 Synchronized Weapon System Series
Add the gimmick of firing a Crash weapon from the handle as well as introducing much more complex gimmicks.

B-Daman Crossfire
The latest series of B-Daman which has a toyline and anime series. It is completely different compared to the previous B-Daman. Its main character is a boy named Riki. B-Daman Crossfire was directly followed by B-Daman Fireblast.

B-Daman Fireblast
The newest B-Daman Crossfire series is called B-Daman Fireblast (known as Cross Fight B-Daman eS in Japan), which introduced emblem charge attacks. It is the succeeding show to B-Daman Crossfire.

Adaptations

Manga
Bomberman B-Daman Bakugaiden (1997–1999)
Bomberman B-Daman Bakugaiden V (1998)
Super B-Daman (1995–2001)
B-Legend! Battle B-Daman (2002–2005)
Crash B-Daman (2006–2007)
B-Daman Crossfire (2011–2012)
B-Daman Fireblast (2012–2013)

TV series
Bomberman B-Daman Bakugaiden (1998–1999)
Bomberman B-Daman Bakugaiden V (1999–2000)
Super B-Daman (1999)
Battle B-Daman (2004)
Battle B-Daman: Fire Spirits! (2005)
Crash B-Daman (2006)
B-Daman Crossfire (2011–2012)
B-Daman Fireblast (2012–2013)

Video games
Bomberman B-Daman (Super Famicom, Japan Only)
Super B-Daman (Game Boy, Super Famicom, Japan Only)
Bomberman B-Daman Bakugaiden (Game Boy Color, Japan Only)
B-Densetsu Battle B-Daman (Game Boy Advance)
B-Densetsu Battle B-Daman 2 (Game Boy Advance, being released in the US as B-Daman: Fire Spirits)
Super B-Daman: Battle Phoenix 64 (Nintendo 64, Japan Only)

Card
Bomberman B-Daman Bakugaiden card game
B-Battle B-Daman card game b-daman scan thit wo the card

See also
List of toys

References

External links

The B-Daman Wiki Forums, a community dedicated to B-Daman 
Atlus USA's Battle B-Daman homepage
Jouets B-Daman France

 
Takara Tomy franchises
Shogakukan franchises